A Special 30th Anniversary Celebration of Rhythm Nation was a brief concert tour by American recording artist Janet Jackson. The tour commemorates the 30th anniversary of the release of her fourth studio album, Janet Jackson's Rhythm Nation 1814 (1989). It followed the success of Jackson's residency show. The spot dates in the United States were followed by headlining at RNB Fridays Live (Australia) and Friday Jams Live (New Zealand).

Critical reception
Jon Bream of the Star Tribune stated Jackson still shined without all the glitz. He says, "Jackson unleashed irresistible club bangers, found nasty rhythms and grooves, cooed cuddly ballads, delivered pop favorites and unearthed enough deep tracks to reward the hard-core fans, something that was missing on the 2011 tour."

John Berger (Honolulu Star-Advertiser) stated Jackson's shows in Hawaii were "worth the wait". He went on to say: "[...] Jackson's star power — and a singer, as a dancer, as an entertainer — was as bright as ever Wednesday in the Arena."

Setlist
The following setlist was obtained from the concert held on September 14, 2019, held at the Treasure Island Amphitheater in Welch, Minnesota. It does not represent all concerts for the duration of the tour. 

"Video Sequence"
"All Nite (Don't Stop)"
"If"
"You"
"What Have You Done for Me Lately"
"Control" 
"Nasty" 
"The Pleasure Principle" 
"When I Think of You" 
"R&B Junkie" 
"The Best Things in Life Are Free" 
"That's the Way Love Goes" 
"Got 'til It's Gone"
"Again" 
"Come Back to Me" 
"Any Time, Any Place"
"Let's Wait Awhile"
"No Sleeep"
"Together Again" 
"Someone to Call My Lover" 
"Come On Get Up"
"Rock with U" 
"Throb"
"Feedback"
"Video Sequence" 
"State of the World"
"The Knowledge"
"Instrumental Sequence" 
"Miss You Much"
"Love Will Never Do (Without You)"
"Alright"
"Escapade"
"Black Cat"
"Video Sequence" 
"Rhythm Nation"
Encore
"All for You"
"Made for Now"

Tour dates

Festivals and other miscellaneous performances
This concert was a part of the "2019 Summer Concert Series"
This concert was a part of "RNB Fridays Live"
This concert was a part of "Friday Jams Live"

Box office score data

References

2019 concert tours
Janet Jackson concert tours